Millerstown may refer to:

Places
Ireland
Millerstown, County Westmeath, a townland in the civil parish of Killucan 

United States
Millerstown, Kentucky
Millerstown, Champaign County, Ohio
Millerstown, Sandusky County, Ohio
Millerstown, Pennsylvania, in Perry County
Millerstown, Blair County, Pennsylvania
Macungie, Pennsylvania, which was known as Millerstown until officially renamed in 1875